is a Japanese manga series written by Takeuchi Ryosuke and illustrated by Miyokawa Masaru.  The series follows Maho Shirafune as he tries to become an astronaut. St&rs was serialized in Shueisha's Weekly Shōnen Jump from June 2011 to April 2012, with its chapters compiled into five tankōbon volumes.

Plot
On August 10, 2019, Earth received a signal, which was confirmed by hundreds of different scientists to be from an alien life form. The message: "Let us meet on Mars on July 7, 2035". With this, a space agency representing all of Earth was formed, named ST&RS. From there on, many different events occurred quite quickly, such as the re-landing of people on the moon in 2022 and the construction of many new space stations. Later on, the Space Academy was founded as a way to train upcoming generations of ST&RS.

Also on August 10 of 2019, the same day that Earth received the message from the alien life form, a young boy named Shirafune Maho uttered his first word, and the word was "Mars". Ever since that moment, Maho has been obsessed with astronomy, and the only thing that he has on his mind is the universe. He decides at an early age that he will apply to the Space Academy to train to become an astronaut, along with his childhood friend, Hishihara Meguru, and a transfer student and genius classmate, Amachi Wataru. The newfound trio begins a seemingly impossible journey to get accepted into an academy where all applicants only have a 1% chance of being accepted into the Space Academy.

Characters 

The main protagonist of the series. He is a 15-year-old boy who aims to be in the Space Academy so that he can get to Mars in 2035. Although he can be quite stubborn, he is also quick witted and smart. He is also known for knowing everything there is to know about space. He can approximate the proper location of the planets along with their respectful distances to the sun and each other, and can almost instinctively know if something is off or inaccurate.  He is kind-hearted, and will always reach out to somebody in need. Maho also works very well with his friends, making him a very good partner. His first word was Mars. He is good friends with Meguru Hishihara and Wataru Amachi.
One of his particular traits is his remarkable sense of distance perception and three-dimensional processing abilities, dubbed "Dimensional Ability". He can accurately shoot a bottle into a recycling bin's narrow opening from a fair distance and recreate a model of the Apollo spaceship while blindfolded after following a few instructions/analogies read to him by his friends.

One of the main characters in the story. She is Maho's childhood friend, both having been born in the same hospital, albeit a day apart. Although she tends to act more like his "guardian" from time to time, she harbors a secret affection for Maho, becoming embarrassed or flustered whenever the subject or anything related to it is brought up. Originally, Meguru did not want to become an astronaut. Her original dream was to obtain a gold medal for volleyball in the Olympics. She was also somewhat responsible for Maho's drive to reach his goal.
Out of the three of them (Maho, Meguru, and Wataru), Meguru seems to be the most physically fit, having gone through "volleyball death camp". Quite a few characters are curious as to what exactly went on during that camp. However of the three of them, she knows the least about space.

One of the main characters. He transfers from Tokyo to Maho and Meguru's school a week before the briefing session for the space academy. Maho could feel a kindred spirit in Wataru; with both being interested in space. When he was younger, he wanted to become a doctor, like his father, until he met one of his father's colleagues—who was an astronaut doctor. That began his dreams of becoming an astronaut himself, while also becoming a doctor. He also seems to be quite popular with females.
Wataru, as a foil to his friends, is the calm, level-headed one of the group; only being provoked after someone jokes about another person's welfare. In addition, Wataru is their resident genius, often providing helpful facts and other tidbits of information.

Publication 
St&rs, written by Takeuchi Ryosuke and illustrated by Miyokawa Masaru, was serialized in Shueisha's Weekly Shōnen Jump from July 4, 2011, to April 16, 2012. Shueisha collected its chapters in five tankōbon volumes released from November 4, 2011, to June 4, 2012.

The manga has been published by Panini Comics in France.

See also 
 All You Need Is Kill, a light novel whose manga adaptation is written by Ryosuke Takeuchi
 Moriarty the Patriot, another manga series written by Ryosuke Takeuchi

References

Further reading 
 

2011 manga
Science fiction anime and manga
Shōnen manga
Shueisha manga